Pescosolido (locally Pesc'tësòllërë) is a comune (municipality) in the Province of Frosinone in the Italian region Lazio, located about  east of Rome and about  northeast of Frosinone.

Pescosolido borders the following municipalities: Balsorano, Campoli Appennino, Sora, Villavallelonga.

Main sights 
 Church of Saint John the Baptist and Saint John the Evangelist
 Church of Saint Roch (with a stone façade)
 Church of San Pantalon
 Church of Our Lady of Pompeii (forcella)
 Church of Our Lady of Snows
 Lacerno Valley
 Parco Nazionale d'Abruzzo, Lazio e Molise
 Palazzo Cianfarani Isola
 Town House Palace

References

External links 
 Official website

Cities and towns in Lazio